Zhang Yuxuan (born 24 January 1995) is a Chinese footballer currently playing as a midfielder for Shaanxi Chang'an Athletic F.C.

Career statistics

Club
.

References

1995 births
Living people
Chinese footballers
Chinese expatriate footballers
Association football midfielders
Campeonato de Portugal (league) players
China League One players
Beijing Renhe F.C. players
Inner Mongolia Zhongyou F.C. players
C.D. Aves players
C.D.C. Montalegre players
Shaanxi Chang'an Athletic F.C. players
Chinese expatriate sportspeople in Portugal
Expatriate footballers in Portugal